Pierre-Anselme Garrau (19 February 1762 - 15 October 1829) was a French lawyer and politician. He served as a replacement deputy to the Legislative Assembly and the National Convention. He is notable for his part in the negotiations leading to the Armistice of Bologna.

External links
http://data.bnf.fr/12459983/pierre-anselme_garrau/
  Works by Garrau in the Österreichische Nationalbibliothek

1762 births
1819 deaths
18th-century French lawyers
French diplomats